Jalander "Jal" Fazer is a fictional character in the television series Skins portrayed by Larissa Wilson.

Characterisation
Jal is described by the official Skins website as "super bright and the most talented young clarinet player in the country". The daughter of fictional celebrity Ronny Fazer, she is easily the most affluent of all of her friends, of whom she is closest to Michelle Richardson and Chris Miles. As a highly talented and intellectual teenager, she defies various stereotypes. Her school is quick to take pride in (and responsibility for) her success, despite carrying little interest in the naturally gifted Jal. She is very straightforward and self-aware, and has contempt for her brothers' fake "ghetto" personas as well as Tony Stonem's poor treatment of Michelle, and the way in which Sid Jenkins ignores Cassie. Despite this, she can occasionally come across as something of a goody-goody, as several characters occasionally point out her preference for her clarinet over her friends, with Chris making a pact with her, in which she has to "stop saying "no" all the time."

According to her Myspace-style "about me" section on the Skins website she dislikes modern pop artists and wishes to "sue MTV Base for prolonged emotional distress". Her favourite "musical dynamics" are Dolce, Affettuoso, Rubato and Giocoso. Her other favourite things include eating chips, Maxxie Oliver's dancing, and the correlation between maths and music (Pythagorean triples). She is also incredibly driven, finding herself knowing more than her careers advisor, having planned out her future, and having to pass up a fifteen-minute interview in awkward silence.

Character history

Series 1
Jal is first seen in the opening episode practising her clarinet when she is interrupted by Tony's phone call. She tells him to stop calling Michelle 'nips' and rejects the invitation to Abigail's party, hinting at her anti-party lifestyle which is explored further in her central episode. In "Jal", Jal anticipates her clarinet recital (for place of BBC Young Musician of the Year) and impresses all her friends by looking great with the aid of Michelle. She also spots Tony flirt with Abigail, much to Jal's disgust. Her clarinet is broken by Sid's drug dealing enemy Madison Twatter, who smashes it before being chased away by her brothers Ace and Lynton (who are subsequently beaten into hospital). Her dad surprises her by buying her a new clarinet and having Madison abducted (presumably killed). Later, in "Chris" it is revealed she did not win Young Musician of the Year and only received £25 to cover her traveling costs. She grows closer to Chris as he is abandoned by both parents and left homeless, whilst beginning to become aware of his drug addiction. In "Sid" she is critical of Sid for how he treats Cassie and is there to take Cassie to hospital after an overdose. She tells the doctors that she is Cassie's sister, and gets rid of Sid, with whom she is angry, hoping Cassie will recover. In "Maxxie and Anwar", she tries to inform Michelle that Tony cheated on her with Abigail but she does not listen. This ultimately blows off in Michelle's episode where they fall out due to Jal's inability to tell her about Tony's long list of infidelities. However, they reconcile towards the end of the episode. In the series finale, she dances with Kenneth at Anwar Kharral's birthday party and the two seem to grow closer. When Chris starts a brawl, she makes easy work in fighting some of the large male attackers.

Series 2
In episode five of the second season, "Chris", we see Jal and Chris make a deal that he will give his life a go and stop saying 'fuck it' and that Jal will stop saying no to everything, as Chris had previously told her in "Sid" that "you don't have sex at all. You have clarinet lessons." At a party that night, Jal shows her wilder side when Chris dares her to go and get the hat off the head of the singer at the party. She downs a can of beer and snogs the singer right on stage for his hat. Inevitably, she and Chris end up getting together. In a later episode, Angie turns up. However, Chris pulls out of his romp in the toilet with her when he thinks of Jal. When they come out of the bathroom, Jal is there and puts two and two together. Chris then attempts to get Jal back and they get back together, however he doesn't yet know that Jal is pregnant with his baby. In the following episode, "Tony", she is seen in the club with the others but doesn't appear to drink alcohol. Tony tells her she is a bad liar and knows she has a secret. It isn't clear if she told him she was pregnant or not.

During episode eight, Jal's central episode, she continues to battle with the many decisions she needs to make in the foreseeable future. Whilst Jal struggles to decide when to reveal her pregnancy to boyfriend Chris, it is heavily hinted that Chris has a secret of his own. Half way through the episode, it is revealed that Cassie somehow knows of Jal's pregnancy. Michelle and Jal's dysfunctional family discover her secret shortly after. The next day, Jal heads for a musical audition at a prestigious college of arts, and performs well. However, when she returns home, she discovers Cassie looking anxious sitting on the table in the apartment. They both head to the hospital where it is revealed that Chris is suffering from the same illness that killed his brother.

In episode nine, Jal appears at Sid's dinner party, and reveals that she is pregnant, and plans to have an abortion.

Jal got two As and a C in her A-levels.

In the series 2 finale, Jal reveals that she had an abortion. She can barely face getting out of bed on the day of Chris' funeral.
However, Chris' dad banned all of his friends from attending the funeral, worried about embarrassment to the family. Chris' friends decide to watch the funeral from afar, whilst Jal makes this touching speech:

Her story ends with Jal sitting by Chris' grave crying as Chris' dad offers his condolences.

References

External links
Jal Fazer on the official E4 Skins site
Jal Fazer on Myspace

Skins (British TV series) characters
Fictional Black British people
Fictional musicians
Television characters introduced in 2007
Fictional English people
Female characters in television
British female characters in television
Teenage characters in television
Fictional female musicians
pt:Jal Fazer